Andrey Sergeyvich Kraitor (born 5 November 1992) is a Russian sprint canoeist who has competed since the early 2000s. In the early period he competed for Ukraine, from 2009 to 2012 for Azerbaijan. Since 2013 he has competed for Russia.

Biography

Andrey Kraitor was born 5 November 1992 in Vilshanka, Vilshanka Raion, Kirovohrad Oblast, Ukraine. He started canoeing at age seven and was coached by his father Sergey Petrovich, Master of Sports of USSR and Ukraine. His first notable success was in 2001, winning the bronze medal at the "Honour" tournament in Kyiv in the 200 m.

Together with other Ukrainian sportsmen in 2009, Kraitor decided to receive Azerbaijan citizenship to compete for the Azerbaijan team. After that, he won at World Junior Championships. At the 2011 ICF Canoe Sprint World Championships he won gold in 4 × 200 m. In the autumn of 2012 he did not extend his contract with Azerbaijan, and in 2013 received Russian citizenship.

His new coaches were Merited Coach Vladimir Marchenko and Russian canoeist Maksim Opalev. He won several Russian cups and Junior Championships and was successful at the 2013 Summer Universiade in Kazan, Russia. His most notable achievements as a Russian sportsman were two gold medals at world championships, and two bronze and two gold medals at European championships.

He graduated from the State Academy of Physical Culture of Volgograd.

References

1992 births
Living people
Ukrainian male canoeists
Azerbaijani male canoeists
Russian male canoeists
ICF Canoe Sprint World Championships medalists in Canadian
Ukrainian emigrants to Azerbaijan
Naturalized citizens of Azerbaijan
Azerbaijani emigrants to Russia
Naturalised citizens of Russia
Canoeists at the 2016 Summer Olympics
Olympic canoeists of Russia
European Games competitors for Russia
Canoeists at the 2015 European Games
Universiade medalists in canoeing
Universiade gold medalists for Russia
Universiade silver medalists for Russia
Medalists at the 2013 Summer Universiade
Sportspeople from Kirovohrad Oblast